Clathrina philippina is a species of calcareous sponges from the Philippines.

References 

Clathrina
Fauna of the Pacific Ocean
Fauna of the Philippines
Taxa named by Ernst Haeckel
Sponges described in 1872